Mattawa Bay is a freshwater body of the southwestern part of the Gouin Reservoir in the territory of the town of La Tuque, in the Mauricie administrative region, in the province of Quebec, in Canada.

This lake extends in the canton of Poisson and Evanturel. Following the completion of the Gouin Dam in 1948, Mattawa Bay is in its present form as part of the Gouin Reservoir.

Recreotourism activities are the main economic activity of the sector. Forestry comes second.

Some forest roads serve the valleys of the Flapjack River, Bignell Creek and the Mégiscane River. These forest road branches connect to route 404 which serves the Mattawa Bay Valley and connects to the Southeast at route 400 which connects the Gouin Dam to the village of Parent, Quebec via the river valleys Jean-Pierre and Leblanc.

The surface of Mattawa Bay is usually frozen from mid-November to the end of April, but safe ice circulation is generally from early December to the end of March.

Geography

Toponymy
The toponym "Baie Mattawa" was formalized on December 5, 1968, by the Commission de toponymie du Québec, when it was created.

Notes and references

See also 

Bays of Quebec
La Tuque, Quebec